The 2018–19 Dynamo Dresden season was the 69th season in the football club's history and third consecutive season in the second division of German football, the 2. Bundesliga and 8th overall. In addition to the domestic league, Dynamo Dresden also competed in this season's edition of the domestic cup, the DFB-Pokal. The season covered a period from 1 July 2018 to 30 June 2019.

Season summary 
On 22 August 2018, Dynamo parted company with manager Uwe Neuhaus. He was replaced by Cristian Fiél on an interim basis, before Maik Walpurgis was appointed as his permanent replacement on 11 September 2018. Malpurgis was sacked in February 2019, with Cristian Fiél appointed as his replacement.

Squad

Competitions

2. Bundesliga

League table

Matches

DFB-Pokal

Notes

References 

Dynamo Dresden seasons
Dresden, Dynamo